Sarah Ellis (born 19 May 1952) is a Canadian children's writer and librarian. She was born in Vancouver, British Columbia, and attended the University of British Columbia where she received her Bachelor of Arts honours in 1973 and a Master of Library Science in 1975. She also attended the Centre for the Study of Children's Literature, Simmons College in Boston in 1980. She has been a librarian in Toronto and Vancouver. She has also written reviews for Quill and Quire. She teaches writing at the Vermont College of Fine Arts and is a masthead reviewer for The Hornbook.

Ellis has said that she gets her ideas from "Memories, anecdotes people tell me, radio interviews, dreams, newspaper articles, family stories, being curious, observing the world, paying attention."

Ellis is a strong advocate for children’s literature and she belongs to many different clubs and unions such as the Writers' Union of Canada, the Vancouver Children's Literature Roundtable, Children's Writers and Illustrators and many more.

She is an  out lesbian.

Awards
She has won numerous literary awards, including the Lieutenant Governor's Award for Literary Excellence, the TD Canadian Children's Literature Award for Odd Man Out, the Sheila A. Egoff Children's Literature Prize for Odd Man Out, Back of Beyond and The Baby Project, the Mr. Christie's Book Award and the IODE Violet Downey Award for Out of the Blue and The Several Lives of Orphan Jack, and the Governor General's Award for English-language children's literature for Pick Up Sticks.

Works

Novels
Out of the Blue
Pick Up Sticks
Next Door Neighbours
Baby Project
Odd Man Out
Outside In

Picture books
Big Ben
Next Stop
Salmon Forest
Ben Over Night
Queen's Feet
Putting Up With Mitchell

Short story collections
Back of Beyond
A Season for Miracles
A Christmas to Remember
The Tunnel
Gore
Knife

Dear Canada Diary books
A Prairie as Wide as the Sea: The Immigrant Diary of Ivy Weatherall 
Days of Toil and Tears: The Child Labour Diary of Flora Rutherford
That Fatal Night: The Titanic Diary of Dorothy Wilton

Chapter books
The Several Lives of Orphan Jack

Books about writing
From Reader to Writer
The Young Writer's Companion

Anthologies edited
Girls' Own

References

External links 
 
 

1952 births
Living people
Canadian children's writers
Governor General's Award-winning children's writers
Canadian lesbian writers
Writers from Vancouver
Canadian women children's writers
Canadian women librarians
Canadian librarians